Brian John MacLellan (born October 27, 1958) is a Canadian former ice hockey forward and the general manager of the Washington Capitals. He played in the National Hockey League with five teams between 1983 and 1992, winning the Stanley Cup in 1989 with the Calgary Flames. Internationally he played for the Canadian national team at the 1985 World Championships. He joined Washington front office in 2000 and spent 13 seasons in various roles before becoming general manager in 2014, and in 2018 won the Stanley Cup with the team.

Playing career
MacLellan was born in Guelph, Ontario. After playing his college hockey at Bowling Green State University, MacLellan signed as a free agent with the Los Angeles Kings in 1982. During his tenure with the Kings, he would play on a line with Marcel Dionne, and he would have his best year statistically in 1984–85 (31 goals, 54 assists). Despite this, he was traded to the New York Rangers in the middle of the 1985–86 NHL season. He would be traded again, this time to the Minnesota North Stars prior to the 1986–87 NHL season, where he would score a career-high 32 goals.

Near the end of the 1988–89 NHL season, MacLellan was acquired by the Calgary Flames for their playoff drive, which paid off as the Flames won the Stanley Cup. He would remain with the Flames for two more seasons. He would close out his NHL career playing with the Detroit Red Wings for the 1991–92 season.

Post-playing career
On May 26, 2014, MacLellan was named senior vice president and general manager of the Washington Capitals. MacLellan, has been a fixture in Washington for the previous 13 seasons, serving first as a pro scout, then director of player personnel and, for the seven seasons prior to being named the general manager, he was assistant general manager under George McPhee. MacLellan and McPhee had been childhood friends and teammates in Guelph, Ontario and also college teammates at Bowling Green. The Washington Capitals won the Stanley Cup under MacLellan in 2018.

Career statistics

Regular season and playoffs

International

Awards and honours

References

External links
 

1958 births
Living people
AHCA Division I men's ice hockey All-Americans
Bowling Green Falcons men's ice hockey players
Calgary Flames players
Canadian ice hockey forwards
Detroit Red Wings players
Ice hockey people from Ontario
Los Angeles Kings players
Minnesota North Stars players
National Hockey League general managers
New Haven Nighthawks players
New York Rangers players
Sportspeople from Guelph
Stanley Cup champions
Undrafted National Hockey League players
Washington Capitals executives
Washington Capitals scouts